Darryl Yung (born 5 August 1972) is a Canadian badminton player. He competed in two events at the 1996 Summer Olympics.

References

External links
 

1972 births
Living people
Canadian male badminton players
Olympic badminton players of Canada
Badminton players at the 1996 Summer Olympics
Sportspeople from Victoria, British Columbia
Pan American Games medalists in badminton
Pan American Games gold medalists for Canada
Pan American Games bronze medalists for Canada
Medalists at the 1995 Pan American Games
Badminton players at the 1995 Pan American Games